John Murray Faulkner (born 24 August 1952 in Palmerston North, New Zealand) is a retired racing driver. Faulkner spent the majority of his career in sedan based classes. Initially he competing in small touring cars including Ford Escorts and Capris before joining Toyota Team Australia and driving their factory supported Toyota Corolla touring cars. After engine capacity classes were discontinued in the Australian Touring Car Championship, Faulkner moved into Superspeedway racing, establishing John Faulkner Racing to compete in the AUSCAR and Australian NASCAR series, contested mainly at the Calder Park Thunderdome. As NASCAR declined in Australia, Faulkner returned to the Australian Touring Car Championship partway through 1996, and was a surprise starter in the 1996 Bathurst 1000, competing with an ex-Holden Racing Team Holden Commodore, before later constructing his own Holdens. Faulkner's team gradually wound down and left the main series after the 2002 V8 Supercar season. The team continued running Commodores in the second tier Fujitsu V8 Supercar Series until the end of the 2004 season, including briefly running the Holden Young Lions identity.

Faulkner has competed in the Bathurst 1000 on 18 occasions between 1980 and 2005 with a best finish of fifth in 1997.

Career results

Complete Bathurst 500/1000 results

References

External links
Interview with Faulkner at Speedcafe

1952 births
Australian racing drivers
New Zealand racing drivers
Australian Touring Car Championship drivers
Living people
Supercars Championship drivers
Sportspeople from Palmerston North
Australian Endurance Championship drivers